James Onque Scott Jr. (October 17, 1947 – May 8, 2018) was an American boxer and convicted murderer. He became the number 2 ranked contender in the World Boxing Association's (WBA) light heavyweight division while incarcerated at Rahway State Prison in Avenel, New Jersey. Scott fought a total of 22 professional fights. 11 of those fights were contested while he was in prison, and Scott earned pay and WBA rankings from many of those fights, which was considered controversial.

Scott was born in Newark, New Jersey and spent much of his life in prison from the age of 13. After picking up boxing as an amateur in Trenton State Prison, he was granted parole to work as a boxer for a manager in Florida. He fought 11 professional fights in Miami. While on a visit to New Jersey, in violation of his parole, he was arrested and charged with the murder of Everett Russ, as well as armed robbery.  Convicted of the robbery but with a hung jury on the murder charge, Scott was sent back to prison in New Jersey.  After being transferred to Rahway State Prison, Scott formed the Rahway State Boxing Association with prison warden Robert Hatrak, and was allowed to continue boxing professionally at Rahway after connecting with promoter Murad Muhammad.

Muhammad convinced Eddie Gregory, the WBA number 1 contender for the light heavyweight championship, to fight Scott at Rahway in a match televised by HBO. Despite being an underdog, Scott won the fight, leading to him being ranked by the WBA.  He fought several more nationally televised matches and rose as high as number 2, but was later stripped of the ranking because of his criminal record and incarceration. After losing his rank and a brief retirement, Scott defeated another number 1 contender in Yaqui López.

After suffering his first loss more than five months after the López fight, Scott was retried for the murder of Russ and was found guilty and sentenced to life in prison.  He fought twice more, winning the first fight and losing the second.  Scott was paroled in 2005 after serving 28 years.  He was inducted into the New Jersey Boxing Hall of Fame in 2012, and died in 2018.

Early life

Scott was born on October 17, 1947 to Ursaleen and James Onque Scott, Sr., in Newark, New Jersey.  He was the second of twelve siblings. Scott grew up in various areas of Newark, including the Felix Fuld public housing complex and later in the central ward. In 1978, he described his family as "a typical black family."  He also stated that his parents were divorced and that his mother was on welfare. Scott's brother Malcolm was serving life in prison for murder. According to Scott, "I wasn't attracted to pimps or narcotic dealers; I was attracted to the gangs and their leaders." Scott was given his first pair of boxing gloves by his uncle at age 10.

He spent much of his time behind bars starting at the age of 13, when he was sent to a reformatory for truancy. At the age of 18, he was declared an incorrigible and sent to Trenton State Prison. While at Trenton, Scott befriended former Army boxer Al Dickens, who was serving a 51-year sentence for armed robbery. Dickens claimed that he convinced Scott to consider boxing instead of "running around breaking heads with an iron pipe". One of Scott's early amateur fights at Trenton was against Rubin "Hurricane" Carter, against whom he lasted three rounds.

Scott stated that he only pursued boxing seriously after being released in 1968 and subsequently being arrested and convicted of armed robbery. He was sentenced to 13 to 17 years in prison. During this time, Scott became the light heavyweight champion of the New Jersey prison system. According to Pat Putnam of Sports Illustrated, Scott "destroy[ed] opponents until there were no more challengers".

Professional career

Parole and initial fights

During his time in prison, Scott sent letters to various boxing promoters and reached out to them via collect calls. This led to Scott being offered to be managed by an architect named Murray Gaby, who was based in Miami. Gaby made arrangements using political connections to have Scott paroled and allowed to live in Florida. On January 8, 1974, Scott was granted work-parole. He trained at the 5th Street Gym, the same gym where Muhammad Ali trained, and fought at the Miami Beach Auditorium. According to Ali's personal physician, who was present at Scott's first sparring session, Scott did not have money and arrived in a pair of cut-off denim shorts and basketball shoes, and had to have boxing gear put together from available equipment at the gym. Gaby said of Scott's performance in his first sparring session, "When Scott started throwing punches, there was dead silence in the gym. Other fighters stopped and watched. He went two rounds, had the guy out on his feet. Everybody gave him an ovation. Very dramatic."

Scott's first professional fight was against John L. Johnson, who was undefeated at the time and weight 35 pounds more. Although Johnson knocked Scott down in the first round, Scott rebounded and knocked out Johnson in a later round. Scott fought twice against fellow light heavyweights in February, defeating both opponents Hydra Lacy and Willie "The Invader" Johnson. As Scott defeated more and more opponents and subsequently was fighting in the main event, Gaby recalls that it was becoming more difficult for the promoter to find opponents willing to fight Scott. During this time in his life, Scott found adjusting to life outside of prison to be difficult, oftentimes being confrontational with others. He found it difficult to cope or communicate his feelings, except to his common-law wife.

Having won his first eight fights, Scott was ranked as the number 8 light heavyweight contender according to The Ring. In his next match, he fought to a draw against Dave Lee Royster. In the sixth round of the fight, Royster headbutted Scott, and Scott responded with a low blow, resulted in the referee deducting two points from Scott. Royster headbutted Scott again in the eighth round and cut him open above the right eye with the blow.  Neither headbutt by Royster resulted in a points deduction. Scott would later claim that he was not inspired to win the fight because he did not receive a letter before the bout from Dickens, who had written to Scott before every professional fight with a plan to defeat his opponent. After the bout, Scott's promoter Chris Dundee called out Bob Foster and publicly offered him $100,000 for a fight with Scott.

Scott fought twice more in Miami, earning two more victories.  At this point, he had earned approximately $15,000 and was living with a woman in an apartment and had a vehicle. Scott also had a title bout scheduled against John Conteh, the World Boxing Council (WBC) light heavyweight champion, with a $100,000 purse. Despite warnings from Gaby and that it was a parole violation, Scott was driving to Newark for visits home.

Arrest for murder and armed robbery 
While in New Jersey on a visit to the state on May 8, 1975, Scott was arrested and charged with murder and armed robbery.  Sources vary on how Scott was arrested. In one account, Scott heard that Newark police wanted to speak with him. Deciding not to speak with an attorney first, Scott went to the Newark police headquarters. In another account, Scott was picked up by the police for a parole violation. After initially being held as a material witness, he was arrested. According to Scott, the arrest occurred the day before his fight with Conteh was to be announced at a press conference.

According to the Essex County prosecutor's office, Scott and others with him picked up Everett Russ, who was standing outside a bar with a friend. Scott asked Russ to take him to a drug dealer, so Russ led Scott to an apartment belonging to Leo Skinner, who planned to buy drugs from a building next door.  While in the next building, Scott, Russ, Skinner, and William Spinks—one of the men traveling with Scott—took the elevator up but held it for Yvonne Barrett, who was headed to the same apartment they were.  Skinner did not want a crowd at this apartment, so he stopped the elevator at the eighth floor. Spinks then pulled out a handgun and ordered Barrett and Skinner out; Scott stepped off as well, while Russ took the elevator down to wait in the car with another member of Scott's group. Scott received the gun from Spinks and pistol-whipped Skinner, ordered him to strip, and threatened to throw him off the building over concerns he would tell police. Afterward, Spinks pointed the gun at Barrett and took her to her sister's tenth-floor apartment, where $283 and bags containing a white powder substance were stolen. Scott then shot Russ in his car to prevent him from telling police. Russ' body was pushed out of the car, which then sped off, and a nearby motorist wrote down the license plate number, which came back to Scott's car. Newark police located the car and found blood stains and bullet holes. At his second trial in 1981, the prosecutor presented a slightly different version of events, attesting that Scott went into the building alone, robbed Barrett and assaulted Skinner before shooting Russ, who was expecting to receive drugs as well.

Scott's version of events varies based on the source. In one account, he let Spinks borrow the car, and that Spinks partnered with someone from Newark with the nickname "Black Jack", whom Scott stated that he resembled. He also alleged that Newark police were conspiring against him. In another account, Scott claimed he was taking the fall for the robbery for a friend and refused to talk about who borrowed his car, saying, "[t]errible things happen to stool pigeons," referencing informants. Spinks was killed in an armed robbery one month later, before he could speak to police about Russ' death. Skinner stated that while "Black Jack" and Scott did look alike, he identified differences in their appearances and identified Scott as the man who beat him.

In March 1976, Scott was found guilty of armed robbery, but the jury was hung on the murder charge. As Scott was a repeat offender, judge Ralph L. Fusco sentenced him to 30 to 40 years in prison. Initially imprisoned at Trenton, he was transferred to Rahway State Prison on May 27, 1977.  He was assigned the inmate number 57735.

Rahway State Boxing Association and fight with Eddie Gregory 

At Rahway, the prison warden was Robert Hatrak, who had a reputation considered controversial for sympathy toward inmates and an openness toward rehabilitation. Several programs aimed at rehabilitation were operated by Hatrak, including vocational training such as automotive repair and barbershop skills, as well as a singing group and a "scared straight" program. He then conceived of a boxing program, not simply for recreation but where inmates could train to be fighters, corner men, referees, and cutmen as a profession. Upon hearing that Scott was being transferred to Rahway, Hatrak planned to partner with him to utilize Scott's connections in the sport. Scott was placed in charge of the new Rahway State Boxing Association. Inmates in the program received pay and credit toward a reduction of their sentence or parole.

Scott's training regimen at Rahway was intense, and other inmates trained with him as well.  He would begin by running for an hour every morning in the prison yard; according to one inmate, he was so focused that he would not break formation with the inmates running with him. He would then do a thousand pushups. According to Dickens, who was now serving time in Rahway with Scott, he estimated in 1978 that Scott had ran nearly 900 miles in total, performed 51,000 pushups, 16,000 situps, and completed his daily routine with speed bag and heavy bag training. Scott would also spar with inmates and others as part of the program, but problems were found in locating sparring partners. Trenton State Prison's heavyweight champion was brought to Rahway to spar, only to have Scott break three of his ribs. Dave Lee Royster, who fought Scott to a draw in Miami and was an outside visitor, was knocked out by him during sparring and did not return.

Seeing the progress of the boxing program, Hatrak extended an offer to Scott to allow him to continue his professional boxing career if he could secure a promoter. However, Scott could not receive temporary release from the prison for fights unless he was a minimum-security prisoner, so all of the fights would have to take place at the prison. Scott began making phone calls and writing letters, including to promoters Bob Arum and Don King. An inmate at Rahway reached out to Murad Muhammad, a boxing promoter.  Muhammad came to Rahway and met with Scott, and marveled at his physique.  According to Muhammad, he asked Scott if he could fight, and Scott answered, "Yes, I can fight. Can you promote?" Muhammad identified Scott's skill at body punching and called him "the Great Scott", his boxing nickname. Muhammad arranged Scott's two first professional bouts in Rahway, both of which were not televised.  In those fights, Scott defeated Diego Roberson and Fred Brown by knockouts. For the Brown fight, Scott earned $600. 

Muhammad began work on a major fight for Scott against Eddie "The Flame" Gregory, who was then the World Boxing Association (WBA) number 1 light heavyweight contender.  As Rahway's prison auditorium would only hold 450 people, Muhammad needed to find a television network willing to host the fight, so he went to HBO.  According to HBO's sports department head at the time, Dave Meister, he found the idea of the fight at Rahway "both off-putting and intriguing and enticing". In addition to securing HBO, Muhammad offered $15,000 to Gregory for the fight, while Scott was scheduled to make $2500. Gregory was lined up to make money from this fight in preparation for a bout against WBA light heavyweight champion Mike Rossman.

Though initially scheduled to be 10 rounds, the bout was set for 12 rounds only five days before the fight. On fight day, October 12, 1978, Rahway's auditorium was at full capacity, with an additional 1,150 inmates watching on screens in the drill hall. HBO Sports sent Don Dunphy, Larry Merchant, and Sugar Ray Leonard to commentate the fight. Gregory was a 4:1 favorite in betting odds, while inmates bet cartons of cigarettes on similar lines. Scott came out swinging at the start of the fight, and made a bump under Gregory's eye in the fourth round. According to Scott, he then realized he had to pace himself because this fight was likely to go the full scheduled 12 rounds. During the last round, Gregory's corner screamed at him to go for a knockout. The bout ended without one and went to the judge's scores, where all three judges awarded the victory to Scott.

After the fight, Scott called out Rossman. Rossman's father and manager, who was in attendance, said, "It's going to take an awful awful lot of money before I'll let my son in the same ring with that monster." Scott identified that money would be a factor in his ability to compete for a championship. He received his first ranking from the WBA for the victory.

Nationally televised bouts and WBA ranking 

Following his bout with Gregory, Scott had fights hosted on national television. In his first fight after the win against Gregory, Scott defeated Richie Kates by TKO in the 10th round. When asked if he thought the referee did the right thing in stopping the fight, Scott said, "Yes, I do. I was trying to kill him." Scott earned $8000 for the fight, 10% of which was donated to a crime victims' fund. A month after the Kates fight, Hatrak was reassigned and no longer was the warden at Rahway. The new warden, Sidney Hicks, was a guard who had pressed assault charges on Scott at Trenton State Prison for hitting another inmate with a pipe. Shortly after Hatrak was replaced, Scott hired an attorney with what money he had and appealed to be released on bail. This request was denied.

Scott was still allowed to fight professionally after Hatrak's departure. His next fight against Bunny Johnson, aired nationally on NBC, resulted in Scott winning by knockout in the seventh round. Johnson was the fifth choice for an opponent for Scott. Ranked number 3, Scott knocked out Italian light heavyweight champion  at the end of the fifth round. In his entire career, at least four of Scott's professional bouts held in prison were broadcast by NBC Sports, two by CBS Sports and one by HBO. ABC Sports declined to provide Scott with national television coverage due to his felony conviction and incarceration. Scott was ranked as high as number 2 in the WBA rankings. However, he started to receive controversy on why he should be allowed to fight and make money while incarcerated. While Scott was paid for his fights, his earnings were sent to the New Jersey Department of Corrections, and he was given strict limitations on how he could use the money. Approved uses included hiring attorneys for his appeals and paying back his public defenders, donations to a crime victim's fund, and training expenses. Scott said of the situation in a 1980 phone interview, "A lot of people resented the idea of my making money while I was in prison. They didn’t feel I was being punished enough. What am I going to spend it on, anyway? People on the outside just want the people on the inside to be punished all the time."

Loss of ranking and fight with Yaqui López 
Scott's next fight was scheduled for December 1, 1979, against Yaqui López, the WBA number 1 contender for the light heavyweight championship.  Shortly before the fight, WBA light heavyweight champion Víctor Galíndez was stripped of the title, so Muhammad asked the WBA if Scott's fight with López could be a 15-round bout for the championship. Then, in September 1979, the WBA decided to reconsider whether Scott should have a ranking at all based on his criminal record. The major concern at the WBA was the championship being held by someone in prison; the competing WBC had never ranked Scott due to his incarceration. According to boxing promoter Bob Arum, the WBA had only then found out that Scott's incarceration was scheduled for 30-40 years. 

The WBA removed Scott from its rankings in October 1979. The vote on the issue was 60 to 1 in favor of removal, with the lone vote for retention coming from New Jersey deputy boxing commissioner Bob Lee. The WBA cited concerns that as an imprisoned convict, Scott did not set a "good example", and that his opponents were disadvantaged because they had to come to the prison for all of his bouts. Sports Illustrated questioned whether those were the real motives for removing Scott from the rankings, given that the same conditions had applied when the WBA had started to rank him the year before. Scott speculated that the removal of his ranking had to do with the influence of Arum on the WBA, and that Arum offered a contract to Scott in 1979 but Muhammad convinced Scott not to accept it. Scott blamed Muhammad for not looking out for his best interest, while Muhammad claimed that he had exclusive rights to Scott via an agreement with the Department of Corrections. Without being ranked, Scott was not allowed to compete for a championship. Afterward, the WBA reinstated Galíndez as the light heavyweight champion.

As a result of losing his ranking, Scott announced his retirement from boxing. Nevertheless, Scott changed his mind shortly afterward and announced that he was "unretired" and would fulfill his contracts. His next fight was against Jerry Celestine, who he defeated by decision and claimed he was not trying to score a knockout to preserve his hand for a fight with López. After the fight, Scott spelled out his issues with Muhammad and discussed working with his lawyer for permission to fight outside Rahway. Muhammad expressed support for Scott and a desire to continue to help him, as well as optimism that the WBA decision to strip his ranking would be overturned.

The next month, Scott fought López, and defeated him by decision in a fight broadcast on NBC. No knockdowns occurred in the bout, but Scott cut López open as early as the first round. After the match, Scott declared that he should be the number 1 contender and called out new WBA light heavyweight champion Marvin Johnson and WBC heavyweight champion Larry Holmes. López stated that he wanted a rematch.

Murder conviction and later career 

On May 25, 1980, five and a half months after the López fight, Scott had his first professional loss, an upset in which he was defeated by Jerry "The Bull" Martin. Scott was knocked down twice by Martin during the fight, once in the first round and once in the fifth. He was defeated by decision. Scott was paid $40,000 for the fight, of which 10% was donated to a crime victims' fund.

After being ordered by a judge to stand trial, in 1981, he was retried for the murder of Everett Russ and was found guilty.  He was sentenced to life in prison on March 20, 1981. Scott continued to maintain his innocence, insisting he was appealing the verdict and would continue to pursue the light heavyweight championship, though the loss to Martin and subsequent conviction for murder marked the functional end of Scott's consideration as a serious contender. In August, Scott defeated Dave Lee Royster, who had fought Scott to a draw in 1974. Scott's last professional fight was on September 5, 1981, when he lost a unanimous decision to Dwight Braxton. Braxton had formerly been an inmate at Rahway State Prison, serving five and a half years for armed robbery, and he knew Scott at the prison. Scott finished his boxing career with a record of 19 wins, 2 losses and 1 draw.

Later life, death, and legacy

In 1984, Scott was transferred back to Trenton State Prison, and later to South Woods State Prison. He was released from prison on parole in 2005 after serving 28 years. Scott's parole officer, trying to find a way to fill his time, took Scott to a boxing gym with a youth program. There, Scott worked with kids on training and gave tips on boxing to them. He would also travel to watch their matches around the state. On November 8, 2012, Scott was inducted in the New Jersey Boxing Hall of Fame. President of the Hall of Fame, Henry Hascup, stated that Scott's boxing alone would have qualified him for the Hall of Fame much earlier, but his questionable past made entry difficult. Hascup was swayed to make it happen after speaking with the trainers and kids from the boxing gym. In his final years, Scott suffered from dementia and at the end of his life lived in a New Jersey nursing home. He died on May 8, 2018 at the age of 70.

According to Hascup, Scott would have been a household name in boxing had he not been in trouble most of his life. Boxing analyst Steve Farhood has expressed doubt that Scott's story could happen in the modern day.  "I don’t think people would be as lenient and as understanding," he said. "For that matter, I think without the willpower James Scott had maybe none of this would have ever happened maybe it never would have been launched in the first place. To think of how far this guy took this mission given his circumstances was amazing.  It throws stereotypes out the window and it’s a lesson I think in understanding the kind of man that is behind bars. You just can’t generalize."

Professional boxing record

|-
|align="center" colspan=8|19 Wins (11 knockouts, 8 decisions), 2 Losses (0 knockouts, 2 decisions), 1 Draw 
|-
| align="center" style="border-style: none none solid solid; background: #e3e3e3"|Result
| align="center" style="border-style: none none solid solid; background: #e3e3e3"|Opponent Record
| align="center" style="border-style: none none solid solid; background: #e3e3e3"|Opponent
| align="center" style="border-style: none none solid solid; background: #e3e3e3"|Type
| align="center" style="border-style: none none solid solid; background: #e3e3e3"|Round
| align="center" style="border-style: none none solid solid; background: #e3e3e3"|Date
| align="center" style="border-style: none none solid solid; background: #e3e3e3"|Location
|-align=center
|Loss
|
|align=left|Dwight Braxton
|UD
|10
|
|align=left|Rahway State Prison, Woodbridge Township, New Jersey, United States
|-align=center
|Win
|
|align=left|Dave Lee Royster
|TKO
|7
|1981-08-10
|align=left|Rahway State Prison, Woodbridge Township, New Jersey, United States
|-align=center
|Loss
|
|align=left|Jerry "The Bull" Martin
|UD
|10
|
|align=left|Rahway State Prison, Woodbridge Township, New Jersey, United States
|-align=center
|Win
|
|align=left|Yaqui Lopez
|UD
|10
|
|align=left|Rahway State Prison, Woodbridge Township, New Jersey, United States
|-align=center
|Win
|
|align=left|Jerry Celestine
|UD
|10
|
|align=left|Rahway State Prison, Woodbridge Township, New Jersey, United States
|-align=center
|Win
|
|align=left|
|TKO
|5
|
|align=left|Rahway State Prison, Woodbridge Township, New Jersey, United States
|-align=center
|Win
|
|align=left|Bunny Johnson
|TKO
|7
|
|align=left|Rahway State Prison, Woodbridge Township, New Jersey, United States
|-align=center
|Win
|
|align=left|Richie Kates
|TKO
|10
|
|align=left|Rahway State Prison, Woodbridge Township, New Jersey, United States
|-align=center
|Win
|
|align=left|Eddie Gregory
|UD
|12
|
|align=left|Rahway State Prison, Woodbridge Township, New Jersey, United States
|-align=center
|Win
|
|align=left|Fred "Cleveland" Brown
|KO
|4
|
|align=left|Rahway State Prison, Woodbridge Township, New Jersey, United States
|-align=center
|Win
|
|align=left|Diego Roberson
|KO
|2
|
|align=left|Rahway State Prison, Woodbridge Township, New Jersey, United States
|-align=center
|Win
|
|align=left|Jesse Burnett
|UD
|10
|
|align=left|Miami Beach Auditorium, Miami Beach, Florida, United States
|-align=center
|Win
|
|align=left|Raul Arturo Loyola
|PTS
|10
|
|align=left|Miami Beach Auditorium, Miami Beach, Florida, United States
|-align=center
|Draw
|
|align=left|Dave Lee Royster
|PTS
|10
|
|align=left|Miami Beach Auditorium, Miami Beach, Florida, United States
|-align=center
|Win
|
|align=left|"Beautiful" Bobby Lloyd
|PTS
|10
|
|align=left|Miami Beach Auditorium, Miami Beach, Florida, United States
|-align=center
|Win
|
|align=left|Koli Vailea
|KO
|5
|
|align=left|Miami Beach Auditorium, Miami Beach, Florida, United States
|-align=center
|Win
|
|align=left|"Sugar" Ray Anderson
|UD
|10
|
|align=left|Miami Beach Auditorium, Miami Beach, Florida, United States
|-align=center
|Win
|
|align=left|"Fabulous" Frank Evans
|PTS
|10
|
|align=left|Miami Beach Auditorium, Miami Beach, Florida, United States
|-align=center
|Win
|
|align=left|Kirkland "Baby Boy" Rolle
|TKO
|8
|
|align=left|Miami Beach Auditorium, Miami Beach, Florida, United States
|-align=center
|Win
|
|align=left|Willie "The Invader" Johnson
|TKO
|4
|
|align=left|Miami Beach Auditorium, Miami Beach, Florida, United States
|-align=center
|Win
|
|align=left|Hydra Lacy
|KO
|3
|
|align=left|Miami Beach Auditorium, Miami Beach, Florida, United States
|-align=center
|Win
|
|align=left|John L Johnson
|KO
|6
|
|align=left|Miami Beach Auditorium, Miami Beach, Florida, United States
|}

Notes

References

External links

1947 births
2018 deaths
American sportspeople convicted of crimes
American people convicted of robbery
Boxers from Newark, New Jersey
Prisoners and detainees of New Jersey
American male boxers
Light-heavyweight boxers